Bieti may refer to:

Black snub-nosed monkey
Chinese mountain cat